Halone flavescens is a moth of the subfamily Arctiinae. It was described by George Hampson in 1898. It is known from Assam, India.

References

 

Lithosiini
Moths described in 1898